Penicillium inflatum (also named Aspergillus inflatum) is an anamorph species of the genus of Penicillium which produces sterigmatocystin. It is from the Cremei section.

Growth and morphology

A. inflatus has been cultivated on both Czapek yeast extract agar (CYA) plates and Malt Extract Agar Oxoid® (MEAOX) plates. The growth morphology of the colonies can be seen in the pictures below.

Further reading

References

inflatum
Fungi described in 1971